This is a list of notable Mexican British people, including Mexican immigrants to the UK and British born people of Mexican origin with at least one Mexican parent:

 Paloma Baeza, actress
 Marcelo Flores, professional footballer 
 Peter Gadiot, actor
 Charlie Harper, singer, member of the punk rock band UK Subs
 Dhani Harrison, musician, singer-songwriter
 Antonio Pedroza, professional footballer
 Azela Robinson, actress
 Juan Solari, TV and film director, video journalist

References

Mexican
Mexican Britons
 
Lists of Mexican people